Arachnology is the scientific study of arachnids, which comprise spiders and related invertebrates such as scorpions, pseudoscorpions, and harvestmen. Those who study spiders and other arachnids are arachnologists. More narrowly, the study of spiders alone (order Araneae) is known as araneology.

Arachnology as a science
Arachnologists are primarily responsible for classifying arachnids and studying aspects of their biology. In the popular imagination, they are sometimes referred to as spider experts. Disciplines within arachnology include naming species and determining their evolutionary relationships to one another (taxonomy and systematics), studying how they interact with other members of their species and/or their environment (behavioural ecology), or how they are distributed in different regions and habitats (faunistics). Other arachnologists perform research on the anatomy or physiology of arachnids, including the venom of spiders and scorpions. Others study the impact of spiders in agricultural ecosystems and whether they can be used as biological control agents.

Subdisciplines
Arachnology can be broken down into several specialties, including:
 acarology –  the study of ticks and mites
 araneology –  the study of spiders
 scorpiology – the study of scorpions

Arachnological societies 
Arachnologists are served by a number of scientific societies, both national and international in scope. Their main roles are to encourage the exchange of ideas between researchers, to organise meetings and congresses, and in a number of cases, to publish academic journals. Some are also involved in science outreach programs, such as the European spider of the year, which raise awareness of these animals among the general public.

International
International Society of Arachnology (ISA)  website

Africa
African Arachnological Society (AFRAS)  website

Asia 
Arachnological Society of Japan (ASJ) website
Asian Society of Arachnology (ASA) website
Indian Society of Arachnology website 
Iranian Arachnological Society (IAS) website

Australasia
Australasian Arachnological Society website

Europe
Aracnofilia – Associazione Italiana di Aracnologia website
Arachnologia Belgica – Belgian Arachnological Society (ARABEL) website
Arachnologische Gesellschaft (AraGes) website 
Association Francaise d'Arachnologie (AsFrA) website
British Arachnological Society (BAS) website
Czech Arachnological Society website 
European Society of Arachnology (ESA) website
Grupo Ibérico de Aracnologia (Iberian Peninsula) website
Magyar Arachnolgia – Hungarian Arachnology

North America
American Arachnological Society (AAS) website

Arachnological journals
Scientific journals devoted to the study of arachnids include:

Acarologia
Acta Arachnologica – published by the Arachnological Society of Japan
Arachnida: Rivista Aracnologica Italiana
Arachnology – published by the British Arachnological Society
Arachnology Letters – published by the Arachnologische Gesellschaft
International Journal of Acarology
Journal of Arachnology – published by the American Arachnological Society
Revista Ibérica de Aracnología – published by the Grupo Ibérico de Aracnología
Revue Arachnologique
Serket

Popular arachnology
In the 1970s, arachnids – particularly tarantulas – started to become popular as exotic pets. Many tarantulas consequently became more widely known by their common names, such as Mexican redknee tarantula for Brachypelma hamorii.

Various societies now focus on the husbandry, care, study, and captive breeding of tarantulas, and other arachnids. They also typically produce journals or newsletters with articles and advice on these subjects.

British Tarantula Society (BTS) website
Deutsche Arachnologische Gesellschaft (DeArGe) website
The American Tarantula Society (ATS) website

See also

 Cultural depictions of spiders
 Entomology
 :Category:Arachnologists

References

External information links
 International Society of Arachnology
 Spider Myths: Spiders are Easy to Identify

 
Spiders and humans
Subfields of zoology
Subfields of arthropodology